The Faroe Islands boreal grasslands ecoregion (WWF ID: PA0807) covers all of the territory of the Faroe Islands, an archipelago of 18 islands in the North Atlantic, roughly equidistant between Scotland, Norway, and Iceland.  The ground cover is mostly grassland and dwarf shrub heath (about 80% of the land), the remainder is bare ground or sparse vegetation.  There are no forests on the islands.

Location and description 

Climate 

The climate of the ecoregion is Oceanic climate, subpolar variety (Köppen climate classification (Cfc)). This climate is characterized temperatures cooler than oceanic climates farther from the poles, and with milder winters than those of subarctic or continental climates.  No month averages below , and at least one to three months average above .  

The climate in the Faroes is relatively mild for its position at 61-62 degrees north latitude, being warmed by the North Atlantic Current. There are 210 rainy or snowy days per year, typically cloudy and windy.

Flora and fauna 

Most of the land cover is alpine-arctic in character: wildflowers, grasses, and common heather (Calluna vulgaris).  About 20% of the terrain is bare rock with sparse vegetation or moss and lichen.  There are no forests on the island, although remains of birch trees in the soil suggest that trees were more common before the arrival of humans in the 9th century.  In recent years, the Faroes have seen the introduction of climate-tolerant tree species from other oceanic areas of the world such as Tierra del Fuego and Alaska.

Sea birds and birds are the most common fauna, with some sea mammals.  Common birds include puffins (Fratercula arctica), razorbills (Alca torda), and guillemots (Uria aalge).  All land mammals have been introduced by humans.

Protected areas 
There are no officially protected areas in this ecoregion.

References 

Palearctic ecoregions
Temperate grasslands, savannas, and shrublands
Ecoregions of Denmark
Geography of the Faroe Islands